Siaosi Tukuʻaho was a politician from Tonga who served as Prime Minister of Tonga from July 1890 to 1893.

References 

Prime Ministers of Tonga